Nasirabad-e Sadat (also Romanized as Nāṣirābād-e Sādāt) is a village in Ak Rural District, Esfarvarin District, Takestan County, Qazvin Province, Iran. At the 2006 census, its population was 79, in 23 families.

References 

Populated places in Takestan County